Hicham Bouchemlal is a Moroccan association footballer who plays for Etoile FC in the Singaporean S.League. He plays as a midfielder.

Career
Bouchemlal signed for Etoile FC in 2011, and made his debut on the 24 March against Tanjong Pagar. He also scored the opening goal on his debut, in the 3-0 victory.

References

External links
 

1987 births
Living people
Moroccan footballers
Expatriate footballers in Singapore
Ittihad Khemisset players
Association football midfielders
Étoile FC players